Shamele Mackie (born March 5, 1978), known professionally as Papoose, is an American rapper. Well known for his freestyles and prolific mixtape output, Papoose has released four studio albums and 29 mixtapes since 1998.

Born in New York, he began rapping in the 1990s, making his first appearance on Kool G Rap's 1998 album Roots of Evil. Papoose produced and distributed his own mixtapes during the early 2000s, eventually signing a $1.5 million contract with Jive Records. After his debut studio album, The Nacirema Dream, was repeatedly delayed and eventually shelved, he and frequent collaborator DJ Kay Slay cut ties with Jive, and released several free mixtapes between 2006 and 2013. The album was eventually released on March 26, 2013, through Honorable and Fontana. His second album, You Can't Stop Destiny, was released in 2015.

Early life 
Shamele Mackie was born on March 5, 1978. He was raised in the Bedford-Stuyvesant neighborhood of Brooklyn. While an early rumor stated that his ancestry traced back to Liberia, a matrilineal dna test through African Ancestry, Inc. revealed that he actually descends from the Tikar people living in present-day Cameroon. The nickname "Papoose" was given to him by his grandmother for his resemblance as a baby to a Native American child.

Career

Beginnings (1998–2004) 
In 1998, Papoose made his rap debut on Kool G Rap's Roots of Evil album. In 2004, he released his debut single, "Thug Connection", which featured the b-side "Alphabetical Slaughter". Select Records offered him an eight-album deal, which he rejected.

Breakthrough, independent mixtapes (2005–2012) 
After a stint at Rikers Island, Papoose began producing and selling mixtapes independently, one of which he presented to DJ Kay Slay outside the offices of New York's Hot 97, who then invited Papoose onto his radio show. Impressed by his rendition of "Alphabetical Slaughter", Kay Slay signed him to his Streetsweepers imprint. Papoose continued to release mixtapes at a prolific rate, over a dozen between 2004 and 2006, and won the Justo Mixtape Award for Best Underground Artist in 2005. During this time, he became associated with Busta Rhymes's Flipmode Squad, appearing on the remix of "Touch It".

On August 24, 2006, Papoose announced that he had signed with Jive Records in a deal worth $1.5 million. and was planning his debut album, The Nacirema Dream. In September 2007, Kay Slay revealed that he and Papoose had left Jive, saying that they had "almost (became) victims of A&R hell." Papoose continued to release his work independently, dropping nine mixtapes between 2007 and 2012. On the 2009 mixtape 21 Gun Salute, Papoose admitted that he was able to keep the $1.5 million from Jive, despite not releasing an album.

The Nacirema Dream, You Can't Stop Destiny (2012–2015) 
After seven years of development and 27 mixtapes in all, Papoose secured a deal with Fontana Distribution to release his debut album The Nacirema Dream. The album was released on March 26, 2013, to positive reviews from music critics and debut at number 97 on the U.S. Billboard 200. It was preceded by the single "On Top of My Game", featuring Mavado.

On June 2, 2013, Papoose "crashed" Hot 97's Summer Jam with the help of Top Dawg Entertainment, performing The Nacirema Dreams third single "Get At Me" with Ron Browz. Following the release of "Control", Papoose took offence to Kendrick Lamar claiming the title of "King of New York" and dissed him in a remix of the track. Lamar called Papoose's response "comical" and threw shots back at him during the BET Hip Hop Awards cypher. On October 4, 2013, Papoose responded by saying that Lamar would never be "able to shine my shoes, lyrically" and that he was planning to release another diss track on an upcoming mixtape.

On November 4, 2013, Papoose released Hoodie Season his first mixtape since his debut album. He would release two more mixtapes, Hoodie Season 2 and Cigar Society, before releasing his second studio album You Can't Stop Destiny on July 17, 2015.

 Television career, Underrated (2015–present) 
With the release of his wife Remy Ma from New York State prison in 2014, the couple joined the cast of VH1's Love & Hip Hop: New York for its sixth season after receiving "an offer they couldn't refuse". He has continued to appear on the show in seasons seven and eight, before being promoted to the main cast in seasons nine and ten. He also starred in the spin-off show Remy & Papoose: Meet the Mackies, and in the specials Remy & Papoose: A Merry Mackie Holiday, Dirty Little Secrets and The Love Edition. In conjunction with the show, Papoose released the song "Black Love", in tribute to his relationship with Remy.

On February 15, 2019, Papoose released his third studio album, Underrated.

 Personal life 
He is the cousin of multi-platinum producer Pi'erre Bourne.

Papoose has two children with ex-girlfriend Yvetta Lashley, Dejanae Mackie, born November 1996, and Shamele Mackie, born April 1999. He also has a daughter, Destiny, born September 2000.

On May 12, 2008, he exchanged wedding vows with rapper Remy Ma over the phone while she was incarcerated.Rodriguez, Jayson. (March 28, 2008) Papoose And Remy To Marry Next Month – In Prison – News Story | Music, Celebrity, Artist News | MTV News. Mtv.com. Retrieved on 2013-02-26.  In February 2016, they officially married in a formal ceremony, which was featured in the season finale of Love & Hip Hop: New Yorks sixth season. She gave birth to the couple's first child together, Reminisce Mackenzie, on December 14, 2018.

 Discography Studio albums'''The Nacirema Dream (2013)You Can't Stop Destiny (2015)Underrated (2019)Endangered Species (2020)

 Filmography Righteous Kill (2008)Love & Hip Hop: New York (2015–2020)Remy & Papoose: Meet the Mackies'' (2018)

References

External links 

1978 births
African-American male rappers
American people of Liberian descent
American people of Cameroonian descent
American prisoners and detainees
Five percenters
Living people
Rappers from Brooklyn
Underground rappers
Participants in American reality television series
21st-century American rappers
21st-century American male musicians
21st-century African-American musicians
20th-century African-American people